Casanegra is a 2008 Moroccan drama film directed by Nour-Eddine Lakhmari. It was nominated by Morocco to compete for the Academy Award for Best International Feature Film at the 82nd Academy Awards.

Plot 
Two childhood friends, Karim and Adil, prowl the streets of Casablanca, their native city. They do not do much, in fact they hustle rather than work. They are also unashamed dreamers, Karim believing in his "love story" with Nabila, a rich girl, and Adil contemplating emigrating to Sweden but never taking action. One day, the two friends go onto top gear by getting themselves into a big caper.

References

2008 films
Moroccan drama films